Iamb is a band from the Central Coast of California. While it began as a solo recording project by frontman Ross Major, Iamb now performs with various members as a band. The music can be described as a combination of indie, post-rock, or folk music. 

The music video for Iamb's first single, "I Don't Care What Happens," has been featured on MTV and MTVu.

Iamb has released a full-length album and a 7" record on independent label Real Love Records

Band members
Ross Major - Vocals, Guitar, Mandolin, Keyboard
George Major - Cello, Violin

Other contributors
Andy Pyle - Live Guitar, Keyboard, Banjo
Paul Frankel - Drums and Percussion
Kevin Coons - Guitar
Kelly Bold - Vocals

Discography
I'll Stay Waiting (2006)
"Pacific Nature Recording Presents... 1" (Split CD with Kingsauce and Flatsound) (2007)
Come Back Home (Split 7" with Candle) (2007)
"Farewell" (Re-released under his name, Ross Major, digitally) (2008)

References

External links
PureVolume
Real Love Records
Review by Derives.net
Bob Marley

Musical groups from California